Dia (born Kim Ji-eun on June 12, 1992), stylized as DIA, is a South Korean singer and a member of the disbanded girl group Kiss&Cry.

Career 
Dia created a sketchbook called Dia's Sketchbook, in which she places videos of her singing covers of other people's songs. Dia has collaborated with many artist including IU, The Black, D'Nine, H-Eugene, PD Blue, and such.

She was a member of girl group Kiss & Cry, which released two singles (Domino Game & Bad Girl) and then disbanded (although their company claims they are simply on hiatus, there is notably no mention of the group anywhere on the company's website).

Dia is a lyricist and songwriter for other artist's songs such as Twice's Three Times a Day.

Discography

Studio albums

Extended plays

Singles (As lead artist/Collaborations/As featured artist)

Personal life 
Dia attended Sangok High School. She is currently attending Seoul Institute of the Arts.

Awards 
 2008 : Chupung Ryeon Song Festival Award (in Yeongdong County)
 2008 : Youth Song Festival Daesang Award
 2008 : Incheon Bupyeong Award Daesang
 2008 : Gold Dongseongro Song Festival Award (in Daegu)
 2008 : Gold Pohang Beach Song Festival Award
 2008 : The Revenge Song Festival Silver Award (in Ulsan)

References

External links 
 Dia's profile on Winning InSight Music's website
 Cyworld
 official fancafe
 
 

1992 births
Living people
K-pop singers
South Korean rhythm and blues singers
South Korean women pop singers
South Korean sopranos
South Korean female idols
Musicians from Incheon
21st-century South Korean singers
21st-century South Korean women singers